Rudy Hobbs (born 1976) is an American politician from the state of Michigan. He is a member of the Democratic Party and a former member of Michigan House of Representatives.

Hobbs was born in Alabama and raised on the east side of Detroit. He later moved to Southfield, Michigan, graduating from Southfield Lathrup High School. He then studied at Alabama State University and Michigan State University. He married his wife Dedra while a student at MSU. He taught first grade in the Detroit Public School System. He began to volunteer in politics, and was hired by Sander Levin's office.

Hobbs was elected to the Michigan House in the 35th district in 2010.

References

External links

1976 births
Living people
Democratic Party members of the Michigan House of Representatives
21st-century American politicians
People from Southfield, Michigan
Alabama State University alumni
Michigan State University alumni
Christians from Michigan
African-American state legislators in Michigan
Politicians from Detroit
21st-century African-American politicians
20th-century African-American people